Laurent Vial (born 9 September 1959) is a retired track cyclist and road bicycle racer from Switzerland, who was a professional road rider in 1985. He represented his native country at the 1984 Summer Olympics in Los Angeles, California, where he won the silver medal in the men's team time trial, alongside Alfred Achermann, Richard Trinkler and Benno Wiss.

References

External links
 
 

1959 births
Living people
People from the Bernese Jura
Swiss male cyclists
Cyclists at the 1984 Summer Olympics
Olympic cyclists of Switzerland
Olympic silver medalists for Switzerland
Swiss people of Basque descent
Swiss-French people
Olympic medalists in cycling
Medalists at the 1984 Summer Olympics
Sportspeople from the canton of Bern